The 1984 Cal State Northridge  Matadors football team represented California State University, Northridge as a member of the Western Football Conference (WFC) during the 1984 NCAA Division II football season. Led by sixth-year head coach Tom Keele, Cal State Northridge finished the season with overall record of 2–8 and a mark of 0–4 in conference play, placing last out of four team eligible or the conference title in the WFC. The team was outscored by its opponents 248 to 119 for the season. The Matadors played home games at North Campus Stadium in Northridge, California.

On January 1, 1985, the Northern California Athletic Conference (NCAC) announced it had ruled that San Francisco State had used two ineligible players and must forfeit three victories, including anon-conference wins over Cal State Northridge.  With the forfeit, the Matadors' 1984 overall record improved to 3–7.

Schedule

Team players in the NFL
No Cal State Northridge players were selected in the 1985 NFL Draft.

The following finished their college career in 1984 were not drafted, but played in the NFL.

References

Cal State Northridge
Cal State Northridge Matadors football seasons
Cal State Northridge Matadors football